Daddy is a familiar term of endearment, form of direct address, or nickname for father, and may also refer to:

Film
 Daddy (1917 film), a British silent film directed by Thomas Bentley
 Daddy (1923 film), an American film starring Jackie Coogan and Josie Sedgwick
 Daddy (1987 film), a TV movie starring Danny Aiello and Dermot Mulroney
 Daddy (1989 film), a Bollywood film starring Anupam Kher
 Daddy (1991 film), a film based on the book of the same name by Danielle Steele
 Daddy (1992 film), an Indian Malayalam-language film
 Daddy (2001 film), a Telugu film starring Chiranjeevi and Simran
 Daddy (2004 film), a Russian film
 Daddy (2015 film), an American film directed by Gerald McCullouch
 Daddy (2017 film), an Indian Hindi film, starring Arjun Rampal

Television
Daddy (serial), a 2010–2011 Pakistani television drama serial that aired on ARY Digital
Daddy (Keeping Up Appearances), a fictional character in the British comedy television series Keeping Up Appearances

Music
Daddy, former name of the band Supertramp
"Daddy" (Sammy Kaye song), a 1941 song
"Daddy" (Korn song), a 1994 song
"Daddy" (Beyoncé Knowles song), a 2003 song
"Daddy" (Emeli Sandé song), the second single from Emeli Sande's debut album Our Version of Events
"Daddy" (Psy song), a 2015 song
"Daddy" (Coldplay song), a 2019 song
"Daddy" (Tulisa song), a 2019 song
"Daddy", a song from the album In the Hot Seat by Emerson, Lake & Palmer
"Daddy", a song from the album Pieces of You by Jewel
"Daddy", a 1994 single from the Dutch pop group Pussycat

In print
Daddy (novel), a 1989 novel by Danielle Steel
Daddy (poem), a 1965 poem by Sylvia Plath

People and fictional characters
Daddy (nickname), a list of people and fictional characters
Daddy Bazuaye (born 1988), Nigerian footballer
Daddy Lumba (born 1964), Ghanaian musician

Other uses
Daddy (dog) (1994–2010), an assistant dog-psychologist dog owned and used by Cesar Millan
Daddy (slang), a slang term meaning an older man sexually involved in a relationship or having a sexual interest in a younger person

See also
Dady (born 1981), a Cape Verdean footballer
Daddy G (born 1959), an English musician
Daddy X, stage name of hip hop artist and record producer Brad Xavier
Daddies, a brand of ketchup and brown sauce in the United Kingdom and Ireland
Daddies (film), a 1924 romantic comedy
Big Daddy (disambiguation)